McCosker is a surname. Notable people with the surname include:

John E. McCosker (born 1945), American ichthyologist
Kim McCosker, Australian writer
Rick McCosker (born 1946), Australian cricketer

See also
Thomas McCosker v The State